Yohai Aharoni (יוחאי אהרוני; born 8 June 1943) is an Israeli former footballer player and coach who played as a right winger. He is best known for playing in Hapoel Mahane Yehuda and Hapoel Petach Tikva in Israel's prime league. On the Israel national team, Aharoni contributed to Israel's only Asia Cup victory.

Club career 
On 30 September 1967, Aharoni scored the first goal in Hapoel Mahane Yehuda's 5–2 defeat of Hapoel Ramat Gan in Israel's first tier of that era, the Liga Leumit. In January 1968, Hapoel Petach Tikva pressured Mahane Yehuda, through the Petah Tikva Worker's Council of Israel's largest trade union, to trade Aharoni against three specific players of their own. Mahane Yehuda refused the offer and Aharoni went on quarantine so he could be released from his club. 

After the quarantine, in 1969–70, Aharoni had 18 caps for Hapoel Petach Tikva, 17 of which were in the opening squad. His Hapoel Petach Tikva debut was on 18 October 1969, in a 0–0 draw against Hapoel Haifa. In the summer of 1971, after a season at Beitar Tel Aviv, he quit his playing career due to an injury.

International career 
Aharoni earned five caps for the Israel national team, scoring one goal against India in the 1964 AFC Asian Cup. His first cap was on 26 May 1964 against the Hong Kong national team, a game that Israel won 1–0. His last cap was a friendly game against the Netherlands on 26 January 1965, ending in a 1–0 loss for Israel.

Managerial career 
After his active playing career, Yohai Aharoni was a manager for Hapoel Mahane Yehuda, Hapoel Jaljulia, and Hapoel Aliyah Kfar Saba. He also coached in Rosh Haayin.

Legacy 
In 2021 Aharoni was included in the Star Boulevard of Hapoel Mahane Yehuda, highlighting 12 footballers who starred for the club while it played in Israel's prime league.

References

Living people
1943 births
Israeli footballers
Israeli football managers
Association football wingers
Israel international footballers
20th-century Israeli people
Beitar Tel Aviv F.C. players
Hapoel Petah Tikva F.C. players
Hapoel Mahane Yehuda F.C. players
Hapoel Mahane Yehuda F.C. managers
Place of birth missing (living people)